The men's 4 × 400 metres relay event at the 2019 Asian Athletics Championships was held on 24 April.

Results

References

Relay
Relays at the Asian Athletics Championships